An election to Isle of Anglesey County Council took place on Thursday 5 May 2022 to elect all 35 members of Isle of Anglesey County Council. It was held on the same day as all other councils in Wales, as part of the 2022 Welsh local elections.

The election saw the amount of councillors elected to Isle of Anglesey County Council increase, from 30 to 35, as part of boundary changes to the council carried out by the Local Democracy and Boundary Commission for Wales.

Plaid Cymru gained the council from no overall control, leading to the first administration formed of only political parties since the council's creation in 1996.

Election summary

Ward results
The percentage shown for each candidate in multi-member wards is a percentage of the vote against the turnout of the election, as due to the nature of multi member wards, electors each have an amount of votes equal to the amount of seats available, however each elector does not have to use all their available votes.

Aethwy

Bodowyr

Bro Aberffraw

Bro'r Llynnoedd

Canalbarth Môn

Cefni

Crigyll

Lligwy

Parc a'r Mynydd

Seiriol

Talybolion

Tref Cybi

Twrcelyn

Ynys Gybi

References 

Isle of Anglesey County Council elections
Anglesey County Council election